Puerto Bolívar is a maritime port in the municipality of Uribia in the Guajira department of Colombia. It is the largest Colombian port.

History 

The Port of Puerto Bolívar, was created by decree No. 995 of April 5, 1982 by the President of Colombia, Julio César Turbay Ayala, with the name of Harbormaster of  Bahia Portete in order to consolidate the presence of the state in this region of Colombia and exercise sovereignty through maritime legislation on domestic and foreign motor ships that arrived and sailed from Puerto Bolivar and quays of Portete and Puerto Nuevo. In 1986 during the administration of President Belisario Betancur its name was changed to Harbormaster of Puerto Bolívar.

Infrastructure

Railway 
 The mine of the Cerrejón uses the only  freight railway in the country

Port
 Largest coal-export port in Latin America
 Covered conveyor belts and a direct-loading system since 1985
 Receives vessels of up to 

Airport
 Puerto Bolívar Airport,  of runway
 Restricted flight area

Motorway
It links the southern part of the department with the northern part.

Climate
Puerto Bolivar has a hot desert climate (Köppen BWh) with little to no rainfall in all months except September, October and November.

References 
 The Cerrejón Foundations System

External links 
Carbones del Cerrejón Limited, Cerrejón., website. Contains information on operations as well as the company's environmental and community projects.

Populated places in the Guajira Department
Port cities in the Caribbean